In mathematics, transform theory is the study of transforms, which relate a function in one domain to another function in a second domain. The essence of transform theory is that by a suitable choice of basis for a vector space a problem may be simplified—or diagonalized as in spectral theory.

Spectral theory

In spectral theory, the spectral theorem says that if A is an n×n self-adjoint matrix, there is an orthonormal basis of eigenvectors of A. This implies that A is diagonalizable.

Furthermore, each eigenvalue is real.

Transforms
Laplace transform
Fourier transform
Hankel transform
Joukowsky transform
Mellin transform
Z-transform

References

Keener, James P. 2000. Principles of Applied Mathematics: Transformation and Approximation. Cambridge: Westview Press.